Kattankudy Central College is situated in the heart of Kattankudy which is located in the costal area of Batticaloa. The school was established on 6 January 1930, by former education minister, CWW Kannangara, who additionally founded two other colleges located in central Ceylon. Kattankudy Central College is the first Muslim Central College in Sri Lanka.

It's a mixed school with secondary to A-Levels of government curriculum of Sri Lanka

References 

Provincial schools in Sri Lanka
Schools in Batticaloa District